Dębsk may refer to the following places:
Dębsk, Mława County in Masovian Voivodeship (east-central Poland)
Dębsk, Płock County in Masovian Voivodeship (east-central Poland)
Dębsk, Żuromin County in Masovian Voivodeship (east-central Poland)